The 9th General Assembly of Prince Edward Island represented the colony of Prince Edward Island between August 10, 1812, and 1818.

The Assembly sat at the pleasure of the Governor of Prince Edward Island, William Townshend.  Ralph Brecken was elected speaker; James Curtis became speaker after Brecken's death in 1813.

Townshend was named acting governor in August 1812; he was replaced by Charles Douglass Smith the following year.

Members

The members of the Prince Edward Island Legislature after the general election of 1812 were:

Notes:

External links 
 Journal of the House of Assembly of Prince Edward Island (1812)

Terms of the General Assembly of Prince Edward Island
1812 establishments in Prince Edward Island
1818 disestablishments in Prince Edward Island